Tim Leathart (born 22 September 1989) is an Australian track and field athlete specialising in the 100 meters who has competed in the World Championships.

Records and rankings
Leathart is a one-time gold medalist and two-time silver medalist in the 100 meters in the Australian National Track & Field Championships. Leathart's current Australian all-time rankings are listed below.

Competitions

Olympic Games
Leathart was selected in the five-member team for the 4x100 meters at the 2012 Summer Olympics in London, United Kingdom. However, he was not one of the four athletes to run in the actual race.

Senior World Championships
Leathart was selected for the World Championships in the 4 x 100 meters relay along with Jarrod Geddes, Joshua Ross and Andrew McCabe (sprinter)Andrew McCabe. The team competed in heat three, but did not finish.

Statistics

Personal bests

Source:

Achievements
Source:

References

1989 births
Australian male sprinters
Living people
World Athletics Championships athletes for Australia